Kendis Gibson (born September 6, 1972, in Belize City) is a Belizean-born journalist and an anchor for WFOR-TV. He has won two Emmy Awards for "outstanding news reporting" and "sports feature". He has been an anchor and correspondent for CNN, CBS News, ABC News, and a reporter for MSNBC. Gibson also anchored World News Now and America This Morning. He has reported on topics including the crash of the Concorde, the September 11 attacks, the Academy Awards, and the Grammy Awards. He is a member of the National Association of Black Journalists.

Biography
Gibson was educated at John Jay High School (now the John Jay Educational Campus), in the Park Slope neighborhood of Brooklyn in New York City, followed by the State University of New York at Oswego, where he received a Bachelor of Arts in Political Science.

Gibson started his career at the NBC station in Rochester, New York. After spending three years reporting there, he moved to WTXF in Philadelphia as the morning anchor and reporter. He won two Emmy Awards for "outstanding news reporting" and "sports feature". He returned to New York City to be a lead reporter for WNBC NewsChannel. At NBC, he reported on some of the biggest news stories at the time, including the crash of the Concorde. With his home just blocks from the World Trade Center, he was one of the first reporters on the scene following the attacks of September 11, 2001.

Gibson joined CNN and CNN Headline News in January 2002 as an entertainment anchor and occasional news anchor seen nationally. During his three years there, Gibson would often make the rounds on the red carpet including the Academy Awards and the Grammy Awards. Gibson has also spent time in the hosting world with HGTV's I Want That! and as an evening news anchor for KSWB-TV news in San Diego, California.

In June 2010, Gibson joined CBS News in Los Angeles as west coast correspondent for CBS Newspath. Gibson also served as an entertainment correspondent for the network's affiliate service, including topics like the 2011 trial of Mel Gibson when the actor agreed to plead guilty to a misdemeanor battery charge.

Gibson left Southern California to join WJLA, the ABC affiliate for Washington, D.C. area, in October 2011.

In December 2013, Gibson left WJLA-TV to join ABC News as a correspondent. Until January 2019, he was also co-anchor for World News Now and America This Morning. He left the network for NBC News the following year.

On January 19, 2019, Gibson became weekend anchor on MSNBC Live.

On January 18, 2022, Gibson joined CBS Miami as a morning news co-anchor alongside Marybel Rodriguez. On January 25, Gibson and Rodriguez began hosting CBS News Miami's streaming service.

On August 24, 2022, following a month long on-air absence from CBS Miami Gibson's profile was removed from the CBSMiami website.

References

External links
 Twitter account
 WJLA Biography

1972 births
Living people
21st-century American journalists
ABC News people
African-American journalists
American people of Belizean descent
American television news anchors
CBS News people
CNN people
MSNBC people